The Journal of the Electrochemical Society is a monthly peer-reviewed scientific journal covering the field of electrochemical science and technology. It is published by the Electrochemical Society. According to the Journal Citation Reports, the journal has a 2020 impact factor of 4.316.

History
The journal was established in 1902 as Transactions of the American Electrochemical Society. The first 58 volumes were published under this title. In 1931, the journal renamed itself Transactions of the Electrochemical Society, until volume 96 published in 1949.

The transition from Transactions to the Journal occurred over two years 1948 (Vol. 93-94) and 1949 (Vol. 95-96). During this period, both the Transactions and the Journal published the same articles, with the same volume numbering and the same pagination. However, the Journal also incorporated the Bulletin of the Electrochemical Society in it, which the Transactions lacked. The Transactions were then discontinued.

Although the journal was originally meant to include only papers presented at society meetings, in 1952 a mix of unsolicited, as well as meeting papers, began to be published. Beginning in 1967, the journal was divided into 3 sections: Electrochemical Science and Technology, Solid-State Science and Technology, and Reviews and News. The Reviews and News section would be forked off as Interface in 1992, and the Solid-State Science and Technology section became the ECS Journal of Solid State Science and Technology in 2012.

References

External links

Monthly journals
Academic journals published by learned and professional societies
Publications established in 1902
English-language journals
Electrochemistry journals
Electrochemical Society academic journals